Geraldine Anne Thomas  is a senior academic and Chair in Molecular Pathology at the Faculty of Medicine, Department of Surgery & Cancer, Imperial College London. She is an active researcher in fields of tissue banking and molecular pathology of thyroid and breast cancer. Thomas is also a science communicator and has written opinion editorial pieces and provided comment to the media following the Fukushima nuclear disaster. In 2015 Thomas appeared in the TV documentary series Uranium - Twisting the Dragon's Tail  and was called to appear before the Nuclear Fuel Cycle Royal Commission in South Australia in October to answer the Commission's questions regarding the effects and threats of radiation. As of 2016, Thomas is a member of University College London Australia's Nuclear Working Group.

Thomas made several predictions regarding cancer incidence in Japan following the Fukushima disaster. She told the Australian ABC in 2013:

Thomas has stated that fear of the effects of radiation can be harmful, and has urged the media to report responsibly on the topic. Her position on nuclear hazards changed over time, and in 2015 she was quoted by the Minerals Council of Australia as having stated:

Thomas was appointed Officer of the Order of the British Empire (OBE) in the 2019 Birthday Honours for services to science and public health.

References 

Living people
British scientists
Academics of Imperial College London
20th-century British women scientists
Women pathologists
Year of birth missing (living people)
Officers of the Order of the British Empire